Terastia meticulosalis, the erythrina twigborer or erythrina borer,  is a moth of the family Crambidae. It has a wide distribution. In North America, it has been recorded from south-eastern Arizona, southern Texas, Louisiana and Florida. It is also present in Jamaica.

The wingspan is about 39 mm.

The larvae feed on Erythrina species.

References

External links
Bug Guide
Image
Moths of Jamaica
 Terastia meticulosalis  on the UF / IFAS Featured Creatures Web site

Moths described in 1854
Spilomelinae